is a Japanese athlete. He competed in the men's high jump at the 1976 Summer Olympics.

References

1956 births
Living people
Place of birth missing (living people)
Japanese male high jumpers
Olympic male high jumpers
Olympic athletes of Japan
Athletes (track and field) at the 1976 Summer Olympics
Asian Games silver medalists for Japan
Asian Games medalists in athletics (track and field)
Athletes (track and field) at the 1978 Asian Games
Medalists at the 1978 Asian Games
Japan Championships in Athletics winners
20th-century Japanese people
21st-century Japanese people